Chester Springs is an unincorporated community in Chester County, Pennsylvania, United States. It is centered on West Pikeland Township, and extends into Charlestown Township, Upper Uwchlan Township, Wallace Township, East Nantmeal Township, and West Vincent Township. The Chester Springs Historic District is located in Chester Springs.

Demographics
The Chester Springs postal zone is considerably larger than Chester Springs village. As of the 2000 census, the population of Chester Springs ZIP Code Tabulation Area (19425) was 7,520.

Arts and culture
The Historic Yellow Springs Village is located in Chester Springs. The community includes historic churches, established in the 1770s by German Reformed and Lutheran members. These include two facilities on Clover Mill Road: St. Peter's United Church of Christ, whose current building was constructed in 1835, had its first worship place built by its early German Reformed congregation in 1772. St. Peter's Evangelical Lutheran Church was planted by Heinrich Melchior Muhlenberg. Chester Springs is also home to The Mill at Anselma (Lightfoot Mill), a National Historic Landmark grain mill built in 1747. The Mill at Anselma is considered the best-preserved example of a grain mill of its kind in the country, boasting its original wooden gearing system and millstones. It is fully functional today and continues to mill flour and cornmeal for sale. The historic Larkin Covered Bridge, built in 1881, is located near the village of Eagle.

The SALT Performing Arts Center is located in the community.

Education
Chester Springs principally lies within the Downingtown Area School District. Some areas of Chester Springs are in the Downingtown Area School District, Great Valley School District, Phoenixville Area School District, and Owen J. Roberts School District. The Chester Springs post office is located on Pennsylvania Route 113 near the heart of the village.

Notable people
 Matt Campanale, professional hockey player
Henry Ruhl Guss (1825-1907), Union Army brevet Major General
Jillian Jacqueline, country music singer

References 

Unincorporated communities in Chester County, Pennsylvania
Unincorporated communities in Pennsylvania